Hassar orestis is a species of thorny catfish that is native to the countries of Brazil, Colombia, Ecuador, Guyana, Peru and Venezuela.  It is found in the Orinoco and Essequibo River basins.   This species grows to a length of  SL.

References 
 

Doradidae
Freshwater fish of Brazil
Freshwater fish of Colombia
Freshwater fish of Ecuador
Fish of Guyana
Freshwater fish of Peru
Fish described in 1875
Taxa named by Franz Steindachner